Kantaar is a 2019 Indian Konkani-language film written and directed by Nilesh Malkar and produced by Janet Noronha. It stars Jackie Shroff, Noel Sean and Ester Noronha. The film is about life in Goa, and finding purpose in life. After the award-winning Soul Curry, it is Malkar and Jackie's second Konkani film. The musical film features Lorna singing some jazz songs. It premiered at Ravindra Bhavan, Margao, on 28 January 2019.

Plot
Angie (Ester Noronha) is burdened with a sister, Sandy, who is a victim of kidney failure. Soon after, her father (Alfred Fernandes) dies unexpectedly, leaving Angie to take care of her mother (Liby Mendonca). Angie, burdened with sadness and helplessness, decides to commit suicide. However, she is stopped by Jordan Marcus (Jackie Shroff), a musician and part-time insurance agent.

With Jordan's help, Angie begins to turn her life around. She falls in love with Anthony (Noel Sean). Liby accompanies Sandy to the hospital, while Angie begins to sell bread in the village.

Cast
 Jackie Shroff as Jordan Marcus
 Ester Noronha as Angie
 Liby Mendonca as Angie's mother
 Alfred Fernandes as Angie's father
 Noel Sean as Anthony
 Meena Goes
 Antonette de Souza
 Spirit as security guard
 Luis Bachan
 Dominic

Production
The film was shot in August 2018 in locations in the interiors of Goa like Rachol, Benaulim and Colva in South Goa. Being a musical film, it features a lot of experimental Konkani songs, especially some jazz numbers sung by Lorna. Two of the leads, Noel Sean and Ester Noronha, are known for their singing skills. Together, they had both sung a Konkani version of Despacito. Noronha has previously sung a song for Nachom-ia Kumpasar. The film also features various tiatrists like Luis Bachan, Domnic, Comedian Sally and Velrose Pereira. The film has received support from Entertainment Society of Goa (ESG) Vice-Chairman Rajendra Talak.

References

External links
 

Films set in Goa
Films shot in Goa
2010s Konkani-language films